William Benjamin Synge Stephens, Lord Stephens of Creevyloughgare, PC (born 28 December 1954) is a British judge who serves as a Justice of the United Kingdom Supreme Court and previously served as a Lord Justice of Appeal on the Northern Ireland Court of Appeal.

Early life and education 
He was educated at independent Swanbourne House School and Campbell College. He attended the University of Manchester and graduated with a first-class LLB.

Career 
In 1977 he was called to the Bar of Northern Ireland. He was called to the Bar of England and Wales in 1978, and the Bar of Ireland in 1996. He was appointed a QC in 1996.  He was appointed a High Court judge in Northern Ireland in 2007, and as such he received the customary knighthood. He was appointed to the Court of Appeal in Northern Ireland in September 2017. As an Appeal Court Judge he was sworn in as a Member of the Privy Council of the United Kingdom in 2017.

On the 1 October 2020 he become a Justice of the United Kingdom Supreme Court, following the retirement of Lord Kerr of Tonaghmore. On assuming office, he took the judicial courtesy title of Lord Stephens of Creevyloughgare. In 2022, he and Lord Hamblen of Kersey gave the ruling in ZXC v Bloomberg that individuals investigated by police have a reasonable expectation of privacy not to be named in the media unless charged with an offence.

Personal life 
He married Nicola Gladys Skrine in 1982, with whom he has one son and one daughter.

References

Living people
Knights Bachelor
Members of the Privy Council of the United Kingdom
British King's Counsel
Alumni of the University of Manchester
1954 births